Cranberry Elementary School may refer to:

Cranberry Elementary School (Sarasota County Public Schools)
Cranberry Station Elementary School (Carroll County Public Schools)
Cranberry Portage Elementary School (Frontier School Division)
Cranberry Pines Elementary School